The Augstbordhorn is a mountain of the Pennine Alps, overlooking Törbel in the canton of Valais. Several trails lead to its summit.

References

External links
 Augstbordhorn on Hikr

Mountains of the Alps
Mountains of Switzerland
Mountains of Valais
Two-thousanders of Switzerland